Hellyerite, NiCO3·6(H2O), is an hydrated nickel carbonate mineral. It is light blue to bright green in colour, has a hardness of 2.5, a vitreous luster, a white streak and crystallises in the monoclinic system. The crystal habit is as platy and mammillary encrustations on its matrix.

Occurrence
The environment of formation, associated only with metamorphosed ultramafic rocks, is diagnostic compared with gaspeite, another nickel carbonate which is associated with supergene weathering of nickel sulfides.

Hellyerite is observed forming in shear planes in serpentinite, produced by carbonation of the serpentinite. Hellyerite forms in this environment in nickel rich serpentinites, which are metamorphosed equivalents of ultramafic cumulate rocks such as peridotite and dunite. Peridotite and dunite, when fresh, can contain up to ~4,000 ppm nickel within olivine. 

It was first identified in 1958 in the Old Lord Brassy mine, Tasmania, Australia and named after Henry Hellyer (1791–1832), Chief Surveyor of the Van Diemens Land Company. It is also reported from the Pafuri nickel deposit in Limpopo Province, South Africa.

References 

Nickel minerals
Carbonate minerals
Monoclinic minerals
Minerals in space group 15